The Catholic Church and the Eastern Orthodox Church have been in a state of official schism from one another, with a few short-lived reunifications (such as after the Council of Florence) since the East–West Schism of 1054. That original schism was exacerbated by historical and language differences, and the ensuing theological differences between the Western and Eastern churches.

The main theological differences with the Catholic Church are the papal primacy and the filioque clause. In spirituality, the tenability of neo-Palamism's essence-energy distinction and of the experiential vision of God as attained in theoria and theosis are actively debated.

Although the 21st century saw a growth of anti-western sentiments with the rise of neo-Palamism, "the future of East–West rapprochement appears to be overcoming the modern polemics of neo-scholasticism and neo-Palamism". Since the Second Vatican Council, the Catholic Church has generally taken the approach that the schism is primarily ecclesiological in nature, that the doctrinal teachings of the Eastern Orthodox churches are generally sound, and that "the vision of the full communion to be sought is that of unity in legitimate diversity" as before the division.

Areas of doctrinal agreement
Both churches accept the decisions of the first seven Ecumenical Councils of the undivided Church. These are:

There is therefore doctrinal agreement on:

Both churches reject many novel Protestant doctrines, some important examples of which are the teachings of salvation through faith alone and sola scriptura.

East–West Schism

The Catholic Church and the Eastern Orthodox Church have been in a state of official schism from one another since the East–West Schism of 1054. This schism was caused by historical and language differences, and the ensuing theological differences between the Western and Eastern churches.

The Byzantine Empire permanently withdrew from the City of Rome in 751, thus ending the Byzantine Papacy. The subsequent mutual alienation of the Greek-speaking East and the Latin-speaking West led to increasing ignorance of the theological and ecclesiological developments of each tradition.

The Eastern Church and the Western Church used respectively Greek and Latin as its medium of communication. Translations did not always correspond exactly. This also led to misunderstandings.

Papal primacy

Papal primacy, also known as the "primacy of the Bishop of Rome," is an ecclesiastical doctrine concerning the respect and authority that is due to the pope from other bishops and their episcopal sees.

Other Orthodox Christian theologians, however, view primacy as authoritative power: the expression, manifestation and realization in one bishop of the power of all the bishops and of the unity of the Church.

The Catholic Church attributes to the primacy of the Pope "full, supreme, and universal power over the whole Church, a power which he can always exercise unhindered," with a power that it attributes also to the entire body of the bishops united with the pope. The power that it attributes to the pope's primatial authority has limitations that are official, legal, dogmatic, and practical.
and Papal Infallibility in Matters of faith and morals when he declares ex-cathedra, meaning from the Chair of peter, does not mean literally from the chair but a certain particular authoritative words, while on other topics not relating to matters of faith or Morals the church advises all members of the catholic faith to have filial piety to the Pope (means respect and loyalty for his office and authority bestowed by our Lord). (naturally as long as those particular matters do not conflict faith, morals, nor faith nor conflicts the early holy church councils and what the predecessors (Popes) have already declared holy. when in question the faithful are advised to talk to a priest in private to consult a matter)

In the Ravenna Document, issued in 2007, representatives of the Eastern Orthodox Church and the Catholic Church jointly stated that both East and West accept the fact of the Bishop of Rome's primacy at the universal level, but that differences of understanding exist about how the primacy is to be exercised and about its scriptural and theological foundations.

Filioque

Differences over this doctrine and the question of papal primacy have been and remain primary causes of schism between the Eastern Orthodox and Western churches. The term has been an ongoing source of conflict between Eastern Christianity and Western Christianity, contributing, in major part, to the East–West Schism of 1054 and proving to be an obstacle to attempts to reunify the two sides.

The Filioque clause
 (literally "and  the Son") is a Latin term added to the Niceno-Constantinopolitan Creed (commonly known as the Nicene Creed), which is absent in the original Greek version.  The Latin term  is translated into the English clause "and the Son" in that creed:

who proceeds from the Father .

or in Latin:

qui ex Patre  procedit

Inclusion and rejection
The  is included in the form of the Niceno-Constantinopolitan Creed used in most Western Christian churches,  first appearing in the 6th century. It was accepted by the popes only in 1014 and is rejected by the Eastern Orthodox Church, Oriental Orthodox Churches and Church of the East.

Consequences
Whether that term  is included, as well as how it is translated and understood, can have important implications for how one understands the central Christian doctrine of the Holy Trinity. For some, the term implies a serious underestimation of the Father's role in the Trinity; for others, denial of what it expresses implies a serious underestimation of the role of the Son in the Trinity. Over time, the term became a symbol of conflict between Eastern Christianity and Western Christianity, although there have been attempts at resolving the conflict. Among the early attempts at harmonization are the works of Maximus the Confessor, who notably was canonised independently by both Eastern and Western churches.

Possible linguistic resolution
In 1995, the Pontifical Council for Promoting Christian Unity (PCPU) pointed out that the  conundrum may be a problem of language, rather than a problem of theology. The word  in Greek indicates a primary cause or an ultimate cause;  while the Latin word  indicates a procession but not from an ultimate cause. Metropolitan John Zizioulas declared that PCPCU position shows positive signs of reconciliation for the  issue between the Eastern and Western churches.

Neo-Palamism: theoria and hesychasm

Neo-Palamism

The 20th century saw the rise of neo-Palamism, c.q. "Neo-Orthodox Movement," in the Eastern Orthodox Churches. According to this point of view, which arose in defense of the Palamite distinction between essence and energia, western theology is dominated by rational philosophy, while Orthodox theology is based on the experiential vision of God and the highest truth. According to neo-Palamism, this is a main division between East and West.

Neo-Palamism has its roots in the Hesychast controversy or Palamite controversy (14th century), 
in which Gregory Palamas provided a theological justification for the Orthodox practice of hesychasm. The hesychast controversy lead to a further distinction between East and West, giving a prominent place to the contemplative practice and theology in the Eastern Orthodox Churches. The publication in 1782 of the Philokalia, which lead to a revival of hesychasm, was accepted in particular by the Slavic Orthodox churches. Together with the importance attached to it in the 20th century by the Paris school of Orthodox theology, it has "led to hesychasm's becoming definitive for modern Orthodox theology as never before," with its Palamite Essence–energies distinction.

Rational and mystical theology
According to these modern Eastern Orthodox theologians, western theology depends too much on kataphatic theology. According to Steenberg, Eastern theologians assert that Christianity in essence is apodictic truth, in contrast to the dialectic, dianoia, or rationalised knowledge which is the arrived at truth by way of philosophical speculation.

While Thomas Aquinas argued that kataphatic and apophatic theology need to balance each other, Vladimir Lossky argued, based on his reading of Dionysius the Areopagite and Maximus the Confessor, that positive theology is always inferior to negative theology. According to Lossky mysticism, c.q. gnosiology, is the expression of dogmatic theology par excellence, while positive theology is a step along the way to the superior knowledge attained by negation. According to Lossky, the difference in East and West is due to the Catholic Church's use of pagan metaphysical philosophy, and its outgrowth, scholasticism, rather than the mystical, actual experience of God called theoria, to validate the theological dogmas of Catholic Christianity. Lossky argues that therefore the Eastern Orthodox and Catholics have become "different men," stating that "Revelation sets an abyss between the truth which it declares and the truths which can be discovered by philosophical speculation."

Lossky had a strong influence on 20th century Eastern Orthodox theology, and influenced John Romanides, himself also an influential theologian on his own. Romanides saw a strong dichotomy between Eastern Orthodox and western views, arguing that the influence of the Franks, and western acceptance of Augustine's theology, is the starting point of western rational theology, and the dichotomy between East and West.

This same sentiment was also expressed by the early Slavophile movements (19th century) in the works of Ivan Kireevsky and Aleksey Khomyakov. The Slavophiles sought reconciliation with all various forms of Christianity, as can be seen in the works of its most famous proponent Vladimir Solovyov.

Hesychasm

Hesychasm, "to keep stillness," is a mystical tradition of contemplative prayer in the Eastern Orthodox Church, which already existed in the fourth century AD with the Desert Fathers. Its aim is theosis, deification obtained through the practice of contemplative prayer, the first stage of theoria, leading to the "vision of God". It consists of three stages, namely catharsis, theoria, and completion of deification, c.q. theosis.

The knowledge of God is attained by theoria, "the vision of God." This is also referred to as experiencing the uncreated light of God, the light of Tabor of Christ's Transfiguration as was seen by the apostles at Mount Tabor.

Hesychast controversy

The Hesychast controversy was a theological dispute in the Byzantine Empire during the 14th century between supporters and opponents of Gregory Palamas. Gregory Palamas of Thessaloniki (1296-1359) provided a theological justification for the practice of hesychasm. Palamas stated that there is a distinction between the essence (ousia) and the energies (energeia) of God. While God in his essence is unknowable and indeterminable, the vision of God can be attained when his energy is seen with the eyes as the Uncreated Light. Palamas formulated his ideas on this distinction as part of his defense of the Athonite monastic practice of hesychasmos against the charge of heresy brought by the humanist scholar and theologian Barlaam of Calabria.

Eastern Orthodox theologians generally regard this distinction as a real distinction, and not just a conceptual distinction. Historically, Western Christian thought has tended to reject the essence-energies distinction as real in the case of God, characterizing the view as a heretical introduction of an unacceptable division in the Trinity and suggestive of polytheism.

Catholic views on Hesychasm
The later 20th century saw a change in the attitude of Catholic theologians to Palamas. While some Western theologians see the theology of Palamas as introducing an inadmissible division within God, others have incorporated his theology into their own thinking, maintaining that there is no conflict between his teaching and Catholic thought.

Sergey S. Horujy states that "hesychast studies may provide fresh look at some old interconfessional divisions, disclosing unexpected points of resemblance", and Jeffrey D. Finch says that "the future of East-West rapprochement appears to be overcoming the modern polemics of neo-scholasticism and neo-Palamism".

Pope John Paul II repeatedly emphasized his respect for Eastern theology as an enrichment for the whole Church. While from a Catholic viewpoint there have been tensions concerning some developments of the practice of hesychasm, the Pope said, there is no denying the goodness of the intention that inspired its defence.

Future directions

The Catholic Church considers that most of the differences between Eastern and Western theology are complementary rather than contradictory, as stated in the decree Unitatis redintegratio of the Second Vatican Council, which declared:

The Catholic Church's attitude was also expressed by Pope John Paul II in the image of the Church "breathing with her two lungs". He meant that there should be a combination of the more rational, juridical, organization-minded "Latin" temperament with the intuitive, mystical and contemplative spirit found in the East.

The Catechism of the Catholic Church, citing documents of the Second Vatican Council and of Pope Paul VI, states:

On 10 July 2007 the Congregation for the Doctrine of the Faith published a document, approved by Pope Benedict XVI, that stated that the Eastern churches are separated from Rome (the member churches of the Eastern Orthodox Church, Oriental Orthodoxy and the Assyrian Church of the East) and for that very reason "lack something in their condition as particular churches", and that the division also means that "the fullness of universality, which is proper to the Church governed by the Successor of Peter and the Bishops in communion with him, is not fully realised in history."

On 3 July 2019, it was revealed that during a Vatican meeting with Orthodox Archbishop Job of Telmessos, who represented Ecumenical Patriarch Bartholomew of Constantinople, during the feast of Sts. Peter and Paul on 29 June 2019, Pope Francis stated that unity rather than leveling differences should be the goal between the Catholic and Eastern Orthodox Churches. Pope Francis also gave Bartholomew nine bone fragments which were believed to have belonged to St. Peter and which were displayed at a public Mass which was held in the Vatican in November 2013 to celebrate the "Year of Faith". Despite holding a "cordial" meeting with Russian President Vladimir Putin, with whom the Pope has had a history of good relations, on 4 July 2019 tensions between the Vatican and Russian Orthodox churches still remained, with Pope Francis stating that it is unlikely that he will visit Russia unless Putin agrees to not include the Russian Orthodox Church in the visit. Putin also stated to the Pope that he would not invite the Pope to Russia without this condition. Pope Francis also hinted that he was willing to support the concerns of Ukrainian Greek Catholic Church, which has expressed opposition to both Putin's intervention in Ukraine and the Vatican's current relationship with Putin. 

At the beginning of a two-day Vatican meeting with Ukrainian Greek-Catholic leaders on 5 July 2019, Pope Francis hinted that he supported the Church's concerns in Ukraine and called for greater humanitarian aid to Ukraine. The Pope previously expressed dismay over the Russian Orthodox Church's role in the conflict in Ukraine in early 2019 as well.

See also

Notes

Subnotes

References

Citations

Sources

Further reading

 Joseph P. Farrell God, History, & Dialectic: The Theological Foundations of the Two Europes and Their Cultural Consequences. Bound edition 1997. Electronic edition 2008.
 
 
 
 Tomáš Špidlík, The Spirituality of the Christian East: A systematic handbook, Cistercian Publications, Kalamazoo, Michigan, 1986. 
 G.E.H. Palmer (Translator) Philip Sherrard (Translator) Kallistos Ware (Translator) The Philokalia, Volume 4: The Complete Text; Compiled by St. Nikodimos of the Holy Mountain & St. Markarios of Corinth

External links
Joint Catholic-Orthodox Declaration of Pope Paul VI and Ecumenical Patriarch Athenagoras I, 7 December 1965
BBC Radio 4 round table: In Our Time: Schism (16 October 2003) (audio)
IOCS link for interfaith discussions at University of Cambridge
Orthodox response to allegations of being Platonistic and or NeoPlatonism
Dialogue with the Eastern Orthodox Churches on the Vatican website.
NeoThomism by N. Berdyaev
Trinity theology Stanford
Twelve Differences Between the Orthodox and the Catholic Churches at the Vivificat blog.
Differences by Orthodox theologian Michael Azkoul 
Orthodoxy and Catholicism Compared by Archpriest Gregory Hallam - Greek Orthodox Patriarchate of Antioch 

Catholicism and Eastern Orthodoxy
Eastern Orthodox theology
Eastern Orthodoxy-related controversies
Catholicism-related controversies
Christianity in the Byzantine Empire
Catholic studies
Filioque